The women's time trial was part of the 2011 UCI Para-cycling Track World Championships, held in Montichiari, Italy, in March 2011.

Cyclists classified as C1, C2, C4 and C5 (locomotor disability) rode a 500 m time trial, while Tandem-B (visual impairment) rode a 1 km time trial.

Medalists
There were no medals awarded in the classification C1 event, as there was only one contestant.

C1
The Final was held on 13 March.

C1 - locomotor disability: Neurological, or amputation

Final

C2
The Final was held on 13 March.

C2 - locomotor disability: Neurological, decrease in muscle strength, or amputation

Final

C4
The Final was held on 13 March.

C4 - locomotor disability: Neurological, or amputation

Final

C5
The Final was held on 13 March.

C5 - locomotor disability: Neurological, or amputation

Final

Tandem B
The Final was held on 11 March.

Tandem B - visual impairment

Final

See also
2011 UCI Track Cycling World Championships – Women's 500 m time trial

References

UCI Cycling Regulations - Part 16 Para-cycling, Union Cycliste Internationale (UCI)

Time trial
UCI Para-cycling Track World Championships – Women's time trial